The tenth election to Glamorgan County Council, south Wales, took place in March 1919. It was preceded by the 1913 election and followed by the 1922 election.

Overview of the Result
In this first post-war election a significant advance was made by the Labour Party, which captured a number of seats, and established a comfortable majority on the Council for the first time.

Boundary Changes
A number of boundary changes had taken place since the previous election. The extension of the Swansea Borough boundary caused the disappearance of the Llansamlet, Morriston, Sketty, and Oystermouth divisions which were no longer part of the county. Four new divisions were created in other parts of the county. The old Margam division was divided into two (Margam East and Port Talbot West), and the Llantrisant division was likewise divided into two new wards, namely Gilfach Goch and Tonyrefail, Llantwit Fardre. A new division was also created at Hopkinstown, Pontypridd and the old Aber division was divided into the Cwm Aber and Llanfabon divisions. The number of wards remained at 66.

Candidates
38 of the 66 councilors were returned unopposed.

Most of the re-elected Conservatives represented wards on the outskirts of Cardiff and in the Vale of Glamorgan. Labour candidates were returned unopposed in a number of the mining valleys although sitting Liberals were also unopposed in some of these localities.

Of the eleven retiring aldermen, seven sought re-election to the Council. Three of these namely E.H. Fleming (Lab, Hopkinstown), William Jones (Lab, Mountain Ash)  and William Llewellyn (Lib, Ogmore Vale) were returned unopposed.

Contested Elections
Many of the contested elections resulted in the decision of the Labour Party to run more candidates than ever before. The distribution of these candidates was not uniform, with candidates being run in all Rhondda wards bar two (where two long-serving Liberals went unopposed). In contrast there was only one contested elections in the Aberdare district, and this was more personal than political. Despite the Labour advance at district level in the pre-war period they fielded no candidates.

Outcome
A number of seats changed hands as Labour captured twelve seats and lost only one. Most attention focused on the defeat of two members who had served since 1889, namely Alderman J.M. Smith (Aberavon) and Alderman W.H. Mathias (Rhondda) lost to Labour challengers, but Labour victories occurred in most parts of the county . A third retiring alderman, Evan Davies (Lib, Maesteg) was also defeated while the Rev D.H. Williams (Lib, Barry) sought off a Labour challenger.

Results

Aberaman

Aberavon

Abercynon

Aberdare Town

Bargoed

Barry

Barry Dock

Blaengwawr

Bridgend

Briton Ferry

Cadoxton

Caerphilly

Cilfynydd

Coedffranc

Coity

Cowbridge

Cwm Aber

Cwmavon

Cymmer

Dinas Powys

Dulais Valley

Ferndale

Gadlys
The sitting member was heavily defeated by the minister of Tabernacle, Aberdare.

Garw Valley

Glyncorrwg

Gower

Hengoed

Hopkinstown

Kibbor

Llandaff

Llandeilo Talybont

Llanfabon

Llantrisant

Llwydcoed

Llwynypia

Loughor

Maesteg, Caerau and Nantyffyllon

Maesteg, East and West

Mountain Ash
Lord Aberdare was initially nominated but withdrew, allowing retiring alderman William Jones to be returned unopposed.

Neath (North)

Neath (South)

Newcastle

Ogmore Valley

Penarth North

Penarth South

Penrhiwceiber

Pentre

Pontardawe

Port Talbot East

Port Talbot West

Porthcawl

Pontlottyn
Alderman William Williams withdrew in favour of sitting councillor William Hammond.

Pontypridd

Penygraig

Porth

Swansea Valley

Tonyrefail and Gilfach Goch
The Liberal candidate had sought to withdraw before polling day but missed the deadline and his name was therefore included on the ballot.

Trealaw
The sitting member, David Charles Evans, licensed victualler, withdrew, allowing the Labour candidate to be returned unopposed.

Treforest

Treherbert

Treorchy
Long-serving councillor, Thomas Jones, was defeated and W.P. Thomas withdrew before the poll.

Tylorstown

Vale of Neath

Ynyshir

Ystalyfera

Ystrad

Election of Aldermen
In addition to the elected councillors the County Council consisted of 22 county aldermen. Aldermen were elected by the council, and served a six-year term. Following the 1919 election, there were twelve aldermanic vacancies, following the resignation of Alderman J.E. Evans.

It was initially resolved to re-elect the four retiring aldermen who had been successful at the recent election, namely:

E.H. Fleming (Lab, Hopkinstown)
William Jones (Lib, Mountain Ash)
William Llewellyn (Lib, Ogmore Vale)
Rev D.H. Williams (Lib, Barry)

In addition, the following eight new aldermen were elected:

Llewellyn David (Ind, Port Talbot)
Daniel Daniels (Lib, Dulais Valley)
W.H. Davies (Lab, Gower)
Joseph Howells (Lib, Caerphilly)
Hubert Jenkins (Lab, Cwm Aber) - elected alderman for three years
William Jenkins (Lab, Glyncorrwg)
David Lewis (Lab, Tylorstown)
William Thomas (Lib, Aberdare)

By-elections
Eleven vacancies were caused by the election of aldermen.

Aberdare
Retired grocer F.W. Mander was returned unopposed following William Thomas's election as alderman.

Barry by-election
The by-election at Barry was caused by the re-election of the Rev, D.H. Williams as alderman. John Lowden, who had held the seat for fifteen years and had stood down in favour of D.H. Williams at the recent election, was defeated by a Labour candidate.

Caerphilly by-election
A Conservative replaced a Liberal at this by-election.

Gower by-election
Farmer Charles Bevan of Port Eynon held the seat for Labour following W.H. Davies's appointment as alderman.

Hopkinstown by-election
The successful candidate, John Tristram, was an engine driver on the Taff Vale Railway and the local secretary of the National Union of Railwaymen.

Port Talbot West by-election
Edward Lowther, general manager of the Port Talbot Railway and Docks company chosen as joint Conservative and Liberal candidate defeated Thomas Griffiths (Lab).

Notes

References

Bibliography

1919
1919 Welsh local elections
1910s in Glamorgan